Misakikōen Station is the name of two train stations in Japan:

 Misakikōen Station (Hyōgo) (御崎公園駅)
 Misakikōen Station (Osaka) (みさき公園駅)